Washington Park is a St. Louis MetroLink station. It's platform is located on the city limit line between East St. Louis, Illinois and Washington Park, Illinois. It is primarily a MetroBus transfer and a commuter station with 681 park and ride spaces and 25 long-term spaces. The park and ride lot is accessed from North Kingshighway and St. Clair Avenue.

East St. Louis Senior High School is 0.8 miles (1.3 km) south of the station and the Southern Illinois Correctional Center is roughly one half mile (0.8 km) north of the station.

Station layout
The platform is accessed via a walkway that leads to the bus transfer and parking lot to the north of the tracks and 53rd Street to the south of the tracks.

References

External links 
 St. Louis Metro

St. Clair County Transit District
MetroLink stations in St. Clair County, Illinois
Red Line (St. Louis MetroLink)
Blue Line (St. Louis MetroLink)
Railway stations in the United States opened in 2001